2009 State Basketball League season may refer to:

2009 MSBL season, Men's SBL season
2009 WSBL season, Women's SBL season